is a junction passenger railway station in located in the city of Hikone,  Shiga Prefecture, Japan, operated by the private railway operator Ohmi Railway.

Lines
Takamiya Station is served by the Ohmi Railway Main Line, and is located 9.9 rail kilometers from the terminus of the line at Maibara Station. It is also a terms for the 2.5 kilometer Ohmi Railway Taga Line to Taga Taisha-mae Station

Station layout
The station consists of a side platform and an island platform, connected to the station building by a level crossing. The station building is unattended.

Platform

Adjacent stations

History
Takamiya Station was opened on June 11, 1898. A new station building was completed in March 2002.The station was used as a setting for the 2012 movie Ace Attorney

Passenger statistics
In fiscal 2019, the station was used by an average of 158 passengers daily (boarding passengers only).

Surrounding area
Hikone City Hall Takamiya Branch Office
Hikone City Takamiya Elementary School
Takamiya-juku

See also
List of railway stations in Japan

References

External links

 Ohmi Railway official site

Railway stations in Shiga Prefecture
Railway stations in Japan opened in 1898
Hikone, Shiga